Ellen Kuras (born July 10, 1959) is an American cinematographer whose body of work includes narrative and documentary films, music videos and commercials in both the studio and independent worlds. One of few female members of the American Society of Cinematographers, she is a pioneer best known for her work in Eternal Sunshine of the Spotless Mind (2004). She has collaborated with directors such as Michel Gondry, Spike Lee, Sam Mendes, Jim Jarmusch, Rebecca Miller, Martin Scorsese and more. She is the three-time winner of the Award for Excellence in Dramatic Cinematography at the Sundance Film Festival, for her films Personal Velocity: Three Portraits, Angela and Swoon, which was her first dramatic feature after getting her start in political documentaries.

In 2008, she released her directorial debut, The Betrayal (Nerakhoon), which she co-directed, co-wrote, co-produced and shot. It was nominated for an Academy Award for Best Documentary Feature in 2009. In 2010, she won a Primetime Emmy Award for Exceptional Merit in Non-Fiction Filmmaking for the film.

Early life and education
Kuras grew up in Cedar Grove, New Jersey. She attended Cedar Grove High School, where she served as president of the school's chapter of the National Honor Society. After earning a double degree in anthropology and semiotics at Brown University, she studied photography at RISD and 8mm filmmaking in New York, with the plan to become a documentary filmmaker. In the early 1980s, Kuras planned to study on a Fulbright grant at a film school in Poland but was unable to go due to the introduction of martial law. She is of Polish descent on her father's side and the family surname was originally Kuraś.

Career
Kuras began her film career in 1987, shooting Ellen Bruno's Samsara: Death and Rebirth in Cambodia, the first US movie filmed in Cambodia after the Vietnam War. In 1990 she won the Eastman Kodak Best Cinematography Focus Award for her work on Samsara. The film garnered accolades from the Student Academy Awards and the Sundance Film Festival where it received a Special Jury Recognition.

That same year, she was asked by  producer Christine Vachon to shoot her first dramatic film (Swoon) for director Tom Kalin. The film won her the Sundance Award for Excellence in Cinematography in 1992. This collaboration was the start of a prolific working relationship with Killer Films, which includes projects like Postcards From America and I Shot Andy Warhol.

From that point she became one of the first women to establish an extensive career in cinematography, a department historically dominated by men. Like some of the best cinematographers in the business, she has focused her craft on sculpting light and creating powerful images that enhance story and character, while searching for "alternative ways of seeing the world". Though she started in political documentaries, she quickly branched out to work in every possible genre of film and TV, shooting big budget movies (Blow, Analyze That), independent films (Angela, Eternal Sunshine of the Spotless Mind), documentaries (Unzipped, 4 Little Girls), concert films (Lou Reed's Berlin, Shine a Light), successful TV movies (If These Walls Could Talk), national and international commercials and music videos for musicians like Bjørk, The White Stripes and more.
 
In 1999, she was invited to join the American Society of Cinematographers, thus becoming the fifth female member to join more than 400 male peers.

Over the course of her career, she has received many accolades including the Women in Film Kodak Vision Award in 1999 and was honored at the 2006 Gotham Award for her entire body of work. In 2003 she was the first film technician to receive the prestigious NY Women In Film and TV Muse Award, which traditionally is given to actresses. In 2009 she was a special Honoree at the Santa Fe Film Festival for her leadership and work in the field of cinematography.

She has served on the juries of several important film festivals around the world. In 1997 she was invited to be on the jury of the Sundance Film Festival. In 2013, she was a member of the jury at the 63rd Berlin International Film Festival. In 2015 she was on the Jury of the Belgrade Film Festival and the Camerimage. Always eager to share her vast knowledge and professional insight, she has guest-lectured at many film schools and festival panels, including SVA, NYU, BU University of Texas at Austin, Walker Art Center, Hamptons International Film Festival, Camerimage, Berlinale and Woodstock Film Festival, among others.

Filmography

As cinematographer
Feature films

Documentary

As director
Film

Television

Awards and nominations

Academy Award for Documentary Feature
2009 – The Betrayal (Nerakhoon), nominated, with Thavisouk Phrasavath

Primetime Emmy Awards
2021 - American Utopia, nominated (Outstanding Technical Direction, Camerawork, Video Control for a Special)
2018 - Jane, won (Outstanding Cinematography for a Nonfiction Program)
2010 – The Betrayal – Nerakhoon, won (Exceptional Merit in Non-Fiction Filmmaking for PBS's P.O.V.)
1998 – 4 Little Girls, nominated (Outstanding Achievement in Non-Fiction Programming – Cinematography)
1994 - A Century of Women, nominated (Outstanding Achievement in Non-Fiction Programming – Cinematography)

Sundance Film Festival
2008 – The Betrayal (Nerakhoon), nominated (Grand Jury Prize: Documentary)
2002 – Personal Velocity: Three Portraits, won (Cinematography Award: Dramatic)
1995 – Angela, won (Cinematography Award: Dramatic)
1992 – Swoon, won (Cinematography Award: Dramatic)

Independent Spirit Awards
2008 – The Betrayal (Nerakhoon), nominated (Best Documentary)
2002 – Personal Velocity: Three Portraits, nominated (Best Cinematography)
1992 – Swoon, nominated (Best Cinematography)

Online Film Critics Society Award for Best Cinematography
2005 – Eternal Sunshine of the Spotless Mind, nominated

References

External links

1959 births
American cinematographers
American women film directors
People from Cedar Grove, New Jersey
Living people
American women cinematographers
Film directors from New Jersey
Primetime Emmy Award winners
American people of Polish descent
Brown University alumni
Rhode Island School of Design alumni
21st-century American women